Deyana Gresye Susanti Lomban (born 27 January 1976) is a former Indonesian badminton player who also play for the PB Jaya Raya. She competed at the 2000 Summer Olympics in the women's doubles event partnered with Eliza Nathanael. Lomban who was partnered with Vita Marissa in the women's doubles event was part of Indonesia triumph by made a clean sweep of the five titles at the 2001 Indonesia Open. Lomban with her ability in jumping smash, had won four World Grand Prix titles with three different partners, winning German and Thailand Open in 1996 with Indarti Issolina; two times champion at the Indonesia Open in 1998 with Eliza Nathanael and in 2001 with Marissa. Lomban opted out from the national team in 2002, and moved to the United States in 2003. She then began her career as a badminton coach in 2009.

Achievements

Asian Games 
Women's doubles

Asian Championships 
Women's doubles

Asian Cup 
Women's doubles

Southeast Asian Games 
Women's doubles

IBF World Grand Prix 
The World Badminton Grand Prix was sanctioned by the International Badminton Federation from 1983 to 2006.

Women's doubles

 IBF Grand Prix tournament
 IBF Grand Prix Finals tournament

References

External links 
 
 

1976 births
Living people
People from Manado
Sportspeople from North Sulawesi
Minahasa people
Indonesian female badminton players
Badminton players at the 2000 Summer Olympics
Olympic badminton players of Indonesia
Badminton players at the 1998 Asian Games
Asian Games silver medalists for Indonesia
Asian Games bronze medalists for Indonesia
Asian Games medalists in badminton
Medalists at the 1998 Asian Games
Competitors at the 1997 Southeast Asian Games
Competitors at the 2001 Southeast Asian Games
Southeast Asian Games gold medalists for Indonesia
Southeast Asian Games silver medalists for Indonesia
Southeast Asian Games medalists in badminton
Indonesian emigrants to the United States
American sportspeople of Indonesian descent
Sports coaches from New Jersey
Badminton coaches